This is a list of members of the 48th Legislative Assembly of Queensland from 1995 to 1998, as elected at the 1995 state election held on 15 July 1995.

 The Labor member for Mundingburra, Ken Davies, was initially declared re-elected at the 1995 election by a margin of 16 votes, but the result was overturned by the Court of Disputed Returns on 8 December 1995. Liberal candidate Frank Tanti won the resulting by-election on 3 February 1996, resulting in the Goss Ministry being defeated on the floor of the Assembly.
 On 16 May 1996, the Labor member for Lytton, Tom Burns, resigned. Labor candidate Paul Lucas won the resulting by-election on 5 October 1996.
 On 17 March 1997, the Labor member for Kurwongbah, Margaret Woodgate, resigned. Labor candidate Linda Lavarch won the resulting by-election on 24 May 1997.

See also
1995 Queensland state election
Goss Ministry (Labor) (1989–1996)
Borbidge Ministry (National/Liberal) (1996–1998)

References

Members of Queensland parliaments by term
20th-century Australian politicians